Albert Rudolph Zuroweste (April 26, 1901 – March 28, 1987) was an American prelate of the Roman Catholic Church. He served as bishop of the Diocese of Belleville in Illinois from 1948 to 1976.

Biography

Early life 
Albert Zuroweste was born on April 26, 190, in East St. Louis, Illinois, to Henry and Elizabeth (née Holten) Zuroweste. His uncle was Frank Holten, a member of the Illinois House of Representatives. In 1914, Zuroweste entered Quincy College in Quincy Illinois.  After graduating in 1918, he entered the Kenrick Seminary in St. Louis, Missouri, studying there until 1924.

Priesthood 
Zuroweste was ordained to the priesthood for the Diocese of Belleville by Bishop Henry J Althoff on June 8, 1924. Upon his return to Illinois, he served as a curate at St. Joseph Parish in East St. Louis, Illinois.  In 1931, he left St. Joseph to became superintendent of St. John Orphanage in Belleville. He studied at the Catholic University of America in Washington, D.C., during the summer of 1934. Starting in 1934, Zuroweste served as editor of the diocesan newspaper, The Messenger, and as superintendent of Central Catholic High School in Belleville from 1934 to 1947. He was named pastor of St. Joseph Parish in 1940 and a domestic prelate in 1945.

Bishop of Belleville 
On November 29, 1947, Zuroweste was appointed the third bishop of the Diocese of Belleville by Pope Pius XII. He received his episcopal consecration on January 29, 1948, from Bishop Joseph Schlarman, with Bishops John Cody and Joseph Mueller serving as co-consecrators. In addition to his duties as bishop, Zuroweste became president of the National Catholic Rural Life Conference in 1951 and chair of the Press Department of the National Catholic Welfare Council in 1957. He attended all four sessions of the Second Vatican Council between 1962 and 1965. 

In 1969, Zuroweste became embroiled in a racial dispute in Cairo, Illinois.  He had sent the Reverend Gerald Montroy to Cairo in 1968 to minister to the poor and to African-Americans.  After meeting with the local pastor, Montroy became convinced that the pastor had no desire to welcome African-Americans to his parish.  In response, Montroy reopened St. Columba, a shuttered mission in Cairo, and started holding masses there for African-American Catholics.  He also provided facilities for Black Power activists looking to challenge racial discrimination in that city.  Zuroweste came under pressure from Cairo to recall Montroy, but gave him qualified support after demands from progressive Catholic organizations.  After several shooting incidents, Montroy accused a local white group of vigilantism and the local pastor of trying to oust him.

In December 1971, Zuroweste excommunicated Bernard Bodewes, a diocesan priest he had sent to Cairo to help Montroy.  Bodewes had sued Zuroweste for $7,350 in damages for withholding his pay since January 1st.  Bodewes said that Zuroweste had withheld the pay because he was angry over Bodewes' support of Montroy's initiatives in Cairo. By 1972, Zuroweste took action to evict Montroy and the organizations working in Saint Columba.

Retirement and legacy 
On August 30, 1976, Pope Paul VI accepted Zuroweste's resignation as bishop of the Diocese of Belleville. Albert Zuroweste died on March 28, 1987, in Belleville at age 85.  

During a 2008 lawsuit against the Diocese of Belleville, information was revealed about Zuroweste's treatment of a child abuser priest.  In 1973 Gina Parks, a 16 year-old parishioner in St. Francisville, Illinois, told diocesan officials that her parish priest, Raymond Kownacki, had raped and impregnated her.  Kownacki also encouraged Parks to have an abortion. After hearing her story, Zuroweste did not report the allegations to the police or initiate an investigation.  Instead, he transferred Kownacki several months later to St. Theresa Parish in Salem, Illinois, without any restrictions.  By 1982, allegations surfaced that Kownacki was sexually abusing young boys at St. Theresa, resulting in the 2008 lawsuit.

References

 

1901 births
1987 deaths
People from East St. Louis, Illinois
Participants in the Second Vatican Council
Quincy University alumni
Kenrick–Glennon Seminary alumni
20th-century Roman Catholic bishops in the United States
Roman Catholic bishops of Belleville